D. Luís Pinto de Sousa Coutinho, 1st Viscount of Balsemão (27 November 1735 – 14 April 1804), was a Portuguese nobleman, politician, colonial administrator, and diplomat.

The first of many government posts, Sousa Coutinho was chosen to serve as Captain-General of Mato Grosso, in Brazil, from 1769 until he was forced to resign in 1772 due to having contracted a severe ophthalmia.

Luís Pinto de Sousa Coutinho was the Portuguese envoy extraordinary and minister plenipotentiary in Great Britain from 1774 to 1788, from which he accompanied important events such as the American Revolutionary War, and negotiated Portugal's entry into the First League of Armed Neutrality. He was elected Fellow of the Royal Society in 1787.

Balsemão wrote the 1778 manuscript, Extrait des Notes fournies à Mr l’Abbé Raynal, which describes colonial administration in Brazil and offers a vision of state building. In a 1780 version of the manuscript, Balsemão defended what he said was the benign nature of slavery in Brazil.

He was made Viscount of Balsemão by Prince Regent John by decree of 14 August 1801, after having occupied several government posts.

References 

1735 births
1804 deaths
18th-century Portuguese people
Fellows of the Royal Society
Portuguese diplomats
Portuguese nobility
People from Viseu District